Anta Germane Gaye (born 1953) is a Senegalese painter and sculptor.

Exhibitions 

 1998: Le Pont (metal sculpture), Goethe Institute, Saint-Louis
 1996: Finalists for the President of the Republic Prize for the Arts, Dakar
 1995: Signes Plus (Helsen), Maison de la Culture de Saint-Gervais, Geneva 
 1991: Salon d'automne, Grand Palais, Paris
 1990: Unita Festival, Pian di Massiano, Perugia, Italy
 1987: Art against Apartheid, Dynamic Museum Dakar
 1985: American-Senegalese meeting, National Art Gallery of Dakar
 1983: Cosaan (tradition) Daniel Sorano National Theatre of Dakar

References 

1953 births
Living people
Senegalese women artists